Roland is a locality and small rural community in the local government area of Kentish in the North West region of Tasmania.
The 2016 census determined a population of 83 for the state suburb of Roland.

History 
The village in the locality was the railhead of a line from Railton. It was known as Staverton Railway from 1915, changed to Dasher in 1917, and then to Roland in 1919. It was named for Captain Rolland, an early explorer in the district. Roland was gazetted as a locality in 1965.

Geography
Lake Barrington forms the north-western boundary.

Road infrastructure
The C140 route (Staverton Road) passes through the locality from north-east to south.

References

Localities of Kentish Council
Towns in Tasmania